Witold Giersz (born 26 February 1927 in Poraj, near Częstochowa) is a Polish animator.
His most well-known work is Koń, which won an award at the Cracow Film Festival "for its exceptionally interesting animation technique". A documentary film about Giersz was made in 2012 by Maciej Kur

Filmography
Neonowa Fraszka (February 1, 1959)
Skarb Czarnego Jack'a (1961) 
Mały Western (January 2, 1961)
Dinozaury (February 28, 1963) 
Czerwone I Czarne (June 1, 1964)
The Horse (Koń, January 2, 1967)
Kaskader (1972)
The Old Cowboy (Stary Kowboj, 1973)
Pożar (January 2, 1975)
Please, Mr. Elephant (Proszę słonia, December 31, 1980)
A Little Curious segments (1998-2001)

References

External links 
Witold Giersz at culture.pl

1927 births
Living people
Polish animators
Polish animated film directors
Recipient of the Meritorious Activist of Culture badge